Aquib is a male given name. Notable people with the name include:

 Aquib Afzaal (born 1985), English cricket player
 Aquib Nabi (born 1996), Indian cricket player
 Aquib Nazir, Indian cricket player

See also
 Aqib, a male given name (includes Aaqib)

Masculine given names